Arman Mehaković  (born 9 March 1988 in Bosnia and Herzegovina) is a Bosnian-Herzegovinian footballer currently under contract for Danish side Svebølle B&I. He previously represented HB Køge and Næstved BK.

External links
Profile at goalserve.com

1988 births
Living people
Place of birth missing (living people)
Association football forwards
Bosnia and Herzegovina footballers
Køge Boldklub players
Herfølge Boldklub players
HB Køge players
Næstved Boldklub players
Danish 2nd Division players
Bosnia and Herzegovina expatriate footballers
Expatriate men's footballers in Denmark
Bosnia and Herzegovina expatriate sportspeople in Denmark